Sada Sarvankar is an Indian politician and Shiv Sena leader from Dadar, Mumbai. He is a member of the 13th Maharashtra Legislative Assembly. He represents the Mahim Assembly Constituency.  He had been elected to Vidhan Sabha for three terms in 2004, 2014 and 2019. Before that he served as Corporator in Brighanmumbai Municipal Corporation (BMC) for three terms from 1992 to 2004 till he was asked to contest from Dadar Constituency in 2004.

Defection from the Shiv Sena to the Indian National Congress in 2009
Sada Sarvankar had defected from the Shiv Sena to the Indian National Congress because he was denied a ticket by the Shiv Sena for the 2009 Maharashtra Legislative Assembly election. Sarvankar joined Congress in the presence of Narayan Rane who is claimed to have engineered Sarvankar's defection. The Congress fielded Sada Sarvankar from the Mahim Assembly seat for the 2009 Maharashtra Legislative Assembly election, a move which had upset many members of the Congress in Maharashtra.

Rejoined the Shiv Sena in 2012
Sada Sarvankar returned to the Shiv Sena before the 2014 Maharashtra Legislative Assembly election, contested and won in Mahim Assembly constituency.

Positions held
 1992: Elected as Corporator in Brighanmumbai Municipal Corporation (1st term)
 1997: Re-elected as Corporator in Brighanmumbai Municipal Corporation (2nd term)
 2002: Re-elected as Corporator in Brighanmumbai Municipal Corporation (3rd term)
 2002-04: Standing Committee Chairman
 2004: Elected to Maharashtra Legislative Assembly 
 2014: Re-elected to Maharashtra Legislative Assembly 
 2019: Re-elected to Maharashtra Legislative Assembly

References

External links
 Shiv Sena official website

Living people
Maharashtra MLAs 2004–2009
Maharashtra MLAs 2014–2019
Shiv Sena politicians
Marathi politicians
Year of birth missing (living people)